Gonnus Mons is a large mountain on the planet Mars. The name Gonnus Mons is a classical albedo name. This was approved by International Astronomical Union in 1991.

See also
 List of mountains on Mars

References

External links 
 Gazetteer of Planetary Nomenclature

Mountains on Mars
Arcadia quadrangle